The Pikeville Cubs was the final moniker of the minor league baseball teams based in Pikeville, Kentucky. From 1982 to 1984,  Pikeville teams played as a member of the Rookie level Appalachian League, hosting home games at the Pikeville Athletic Field. Pikeville was a minor league affiliate of the Milwaukee Brewers in 1982 and Chicago Cubs in 1983 and 1984.

Baseball Hall of Fame member Greg Maddux played for the 1984 Pikeville Cubs in his first professional season.

History
Minor league baseball began in Pikeville, Kentucky in 1982. The Pikeville Brewers joined the eight–team Rookie level Appalachian League in 1982. In their first season of play, Pikeville finished with a 25–42 record in the 1982 Appalachian League, along with league members Bluefield Orioles (47–22), Bristol Tigers (28–36), Elizabethton Twins (32–36), Johnson City Cardinals (32–35), Kingsport Mets (28–40), Paintsville Yankees (43–27) and Pulaski Braves (36–33).

The 1982 Pikeville Brewers were an affiliate of the Milwaukee Brewers, finishing in 4th place (last) in the North Division of the Appalachian League. Playing under manager Tim Nordbrook, Pikeville drew 13,441 fans for the 1982 season, an average of 401 per home contest. The Pikeville Brewers finished 21.0 games behind the 1st place Bluefield Orioles in the North Division final standings.

Remaining in the Appalachian League in 1983, Pikeville became an affiliate of the Chicago Cubs and adopted the Pikeville "Cubs" moniker. The 1983 Pikeville Cubs finished with a 33–37 record, placing 4th in the North Division under manager Jim Fairey. The season attendance was 4,998 an average of 143, last in the league. The Cubs finished 13.0 games behind the 1st place Paintsville Brewers in the overall league standings.

The 1984 season was Pikeville's final season in the Appalachian League. The 1984 Pikeville Cubs finished with a 34–34 record, placing 3rd in the North Division  and 5th overall under returning manager Jim Fairey. The Pikeville Cubs finished 2.5 games behind the Pulaski Braves in the final North Division standings. Pikeville was again last in the league in attendance, with 5,511 total for the season attendance. At age 18, Baseball Hall of Fame inductee Greg Maddux pitched for Pikeville in 1984, with 6–2 record and a 2.63 ERA in his first professional season.  During an early season pitching staff meeting with player/pitching coach Rick Kranitz, Maddux reportedly asked "What's the sign for a brushback pitch?" Maddux later approached Kranitz and said, "You need to teach me something." This led to Maddux being shown different grips to throw a change up, which he threw for the remainder of his career.

The Pikeville franchise folded after the 1984 season, with the Cubs Rookie level franchise moving to Wytheville, Virginia, to become the 1985 Wytheville Cubs.

Greg Maddux was inducted into the Appalachian League Hall of Fame in 2019, as part of the inaugural class of the league's hall of fame.

Pikeville was without a minor league team until the 1993 Kentucky Rifles began play as members of the Frontier League.

The ballpark
Pikeville minor league teams were reported to have played home games at Pikeville Athletic Field. The ballpark was also known as "W. C. Hambley Field." The ballpark was located at Hambley Boulevard (US 460 & US 23), Pikeville, Kentucky. The site is still in use by Pikeville High School and University of Pikeville athletic teams.

Timeline

Year–by–year records

Notable alumni

Baseball Hall of Fame alumni
Greg Maddux (1984) Inducted 2014

Notable alumni
Jay Aldrich (1982)
Stan Boroski (1982)
Jacob Brumfield (1983)
Chris Bosio (1982)
Chuck Crim (1982)
Edgar Diaz (1982)
Rick Kranitz (1984)
Dave Liddell (1984)
Tim Nordbrook (1982, MGR)
Hipólito Peña (1982)
Jeff Pico  (1984)
Billy Jo Robidoux (1982)
Jeff Schwarz (1983)
Dwight Smith (1984)
Dale Sveum (1982)

See also
 Pikeville Cubs players
 Pikeville Brewers players

References

External links
 Baseball Reference

Defunct minor league baseball teams
Chicago Cubs minor league affiliates
Defunct Appalachian League teams
Professional baseball teams in Kentucky
Defunct baseball teams in Kentucky
Baseball teams disestablished in 1984
Baseball teams established in 1983
Cubs